Dress is the second album written and composed by Georgian musician Sophie Villy, released on May 27, 2014. Comma.com.ua ranked as the album as the best Ukrainian album of the year in 2014. The Guardian named the song "Connected" as one of the six must-listen new tracks from around the world. The album was recorded and mixed by George Gvarjaladze at Georgian Film Studios in Tbilisi. It was mastered by Ron Boustead.

Track listing

Personnel
 Sophie Villy – Vocal, Guitar, Piano, Organ
 Dima Zinchenko – Drums, Percussion, Organ
 Levan Mikaberidze – Bass
 Stas Kononov – Guitar
 Elene Jimshitashvili – Cello
 Strings – Just Quartet (GE)
 George Gabrielashvili – Trumpet
 Sound engineering – GVAJI
 Front cover photography – Sergey Sarakhanov

References

2014 albums